Jumana Manna (born 1987) is a Palestinian-born multidisciplinary artist, whose work explores the effects of preservation practices in the fields of agriculture, science and law. Manna is known for directing the films Wild Relatives (2017), Foragers (2022) and A Magical Substance Flows Into Me (2015). Manna had her first major American museum show at MoMA PS1. Manna studied at California Institute of the Arts and the Oslo National Academy of the Arts.

References 

1987 births
Living people
Palestinian women artists
21st-century women artists
Palestinian artists
California Institute of the Arts alumni
Oslo National Academy of the Arts alumni